Satchari National Park is a national park in Habiganj District, Bangladesh. Literally 'Satchari' in Bengali means 'Seven Streams'. There are seven streams flowing in this jungle, and the name 'Satchari' came from there.

Details
The park is situated in Raghunandan hill, under Paikpara Union, Chunarughat Upazila, Habiganj District, under Sylhet region. There are 9 tea gardens nearby. Satchari tea garden is on the West and Chaklapunji tea garden is on the East. Approximately 24 families of Tipra Tribe are living now (2007) in the Tipra village.

Plants
There are approximately 200 and more trees are in Satchari National Park. Shaal (Shorea robusta), Segun (Tectona grandis), Agar, Garjan, Chapalish, Palm, Mehgani, Krishnachur, Dumur (Ficus), Jamrul, Shidha Jarul, Awal, Malekas, Eucalyptus, Akashmoni, Bamboo trees, bet trees (regional name Mutra) are the most common species of trees found there.

Wildlife
Wildlife in this park is rich. Red junglefowl, red-headed trogon, Oriental pied hornbill and the range-restricted Cachar Bulbul are some of them. The critically endangered hoolock gibbon also resides here. Also Phayre's leaf monkey, a species of langur also resides here. Asian black bears also reside here in small numbers.

Nisharga Shahayata Prakalpa
Beside the National Forest Department, an NGO named "Nisharga", with their "Nisharga Shahayata Prakalpa", observes the park. Beside the preserving forest they provide eco-tours. The NGO also sells some fancy items there.

See also

 Bhawal National Park
 Lawachara National Park
 List of protected areas of Bangladesh

Notes

Further reading
 
 
 
 
 
 
 
 
 

National parks of Bangladesh
Habiganj District
Forests of Bangladesh
Protected areas established in 2005
2005 establishments in Bangladesh